Vallerano is a  (municipality) in the Province of Viterbo in the Italian region of Latium, located about  northwest of Rome and about  southeast of Viterbo.

Vallerano borders the following municipalities: Canepina, Caprarola, Carbognano, Fabrica di Roma, Soriano nel Cimino, Vignanello.

Among the monumental structures in the town is the 17th century Marian shrine, the Sanctuary of the Madonna del Ruscello, also called the Santuario di Maria Santissima del Ruscello dei Donatori di Sangue.

References

External links
 Official website

Cities and towns in Lazio